Paarl Gimnasium is a public Afrikaans medium co-educational high school situated in the city of Paarl in the  Western Cape province of South Africa.

History
Rev. van der Lingen founded the school in the centre of town in 1858. The school has produced some of South Africa's top rugby players, including Schalk Burger, Jean De Villiers, Marius Joubert, Handré Pollard and De Wet Barry.  Other alumni include the theologian Stephanus Jacobus du Toit and politician Liezl van der Merwe.

The primary school section of Gimnasium was founded in 1858 as a Dutch Christian school for boys, with the high school being founded much later. In the mid-1930s the school's language of education shifted to Afrikaans. After the high school section was completed the school enrolled its first female student.

Paarl Gimnasium High School has a large sporting program and takes part in the interschools tournament against Paarl Boys' High School, an event which attracts tens of thousands of spectators every year.

Sports
Sports played at the school include:

 Archery
 Athletics
 Cricket
 Cross country
 Equestrian 
 Golf
 Hockey (Boys & Girls) 
 Mountain biking
 Netball (Girls) 
 Rugby 
 Squash 
 Swimming
 Table tennis
 Tennis
 Water polo

Notable alumni

Springbok Rugby

Other
Marciel Hopkins, model
Marguerite Wheatley, actress
Perlé van Schalkwyk, businesswoman and owner of the Lollipop Lounge
Liezl van der Merwe, Member of the National Assembly of South Africa
Mandy Rossouw, journalist
Martelize Brink, author and radio presenter

References

External links

 Official website 

Schools in the Western Cape
Paarl
Educational institutions established in 1858
1858 establishments in the British Empire